Sinuapa is a municipality in the Honduran department of Ocotepeque.

Demographics
At the time of the 2013 Honduras census, Sinuapa municipality had a population of 8,735. Of these, 91.05% were Mestizo, 6.91% White, 1.10% Black or Afro-Honduran, 0.87% Indigenous and 0.07% others.

References

Municipalities of the Ocotepeque Department